25 km may refer to:
, a rural locality (a crossing) in Orenburg Oblast, Russia
25 km Zheleznoy Dorogi Monchegorsk–Olenya, a rural locality in Murmansk Oblast, Russia
, a rural locality (military barracks) in Primorsky Krai, Russia